The MPI MP21B is a low-emissions diesel switcher locomotive built by MotivePower. One MP21B locomotive was manufactured, currently operated by Amtrak.

References

External links
 Genset Locomotive Rosters – Information and resource site for low-emission switcher locomotives built by Motive Power Industries.

B-B locomotives
MPI locomotives
Railway locomotives introduced in 2008
Diesel-electric locomotives of the United States
Individual locomotives of the United States
EPA Tier 2-compliant locomotives of the United States
Amtrak locomotives
Standard gauge locomotives of the United States
Unique locomotives